The tenth season of the television series Dallas aired on CBS during the 1986–87 TV season.

Cast

Starring
In alphabetical order:
 Barbara Bel Geddes as Miss Ellie Ewing Farlow (28 episodes)
 Patrick Duffy as Bobby Ewing (29 episodes)
 Linda Gray as Sue Ellen Ewing (29 episodes)
 Larry Hagman as J.R. Ewing (29 episodes)
 Susan Howard as Donna Culver Krebbs (29 episodes)
 Steve Kanaly as Ray Krebbs (29 episodes)
 Howard Keel as Clayton Farlow (29 episodes)
 Ken Kercheval as Cliff Barnes (29 episodes)
 Priscilla Beaulieu Presley as Jenna Wade (24 episodes)
 Victoria Principal as Pamela Barnes Ewing (29 episodes)
 Dack Rambo as Jack Ewing (15 episodes), erroneously uncredited for Episode 9

Also Starring
 Sheree J. Wilson as April Stevens (24 episodes)
 Deborah Shelton as Mandy Winger (15 episodes)
 Steve Forrest as Wes Parmalee (12 episodes)
 Jenilee Harrison as Jamie Ewing Barnes (12 episodes)

Special Guest Star
 Stephen Elliott as Scotty Demarest (2 episodes)

Notable guest stars
Longtime major guest star William Smithers (Jeremy Wendell) continues to appear, and Derek McGrath (Oswald Valentine) and Jonathan Goldsmith (Bruce Harvey) both join the cast. 

Additionally, Hunter von Leer (B.D. Calhoun), J.A. Preston (Leo Daltry), Jim McMullan (Andrew Dowling), Josef Rainer (Mr. Barton), Karen Carlson (Nancy Scotfield) and Frederick Coffin (Alfred Simpson) all join the series for major story arcs, although they won't return for later seasons.

Crew 
For the second year in a row, Dallas''' creative team goes through major changes for season 10. Only associate producer Cliff Fenneman survives the transition from season 9 to season 10. Former writer/story editor David Paulsen replaces James H. Brown as producer and newcomer Calvin Clements, Jr. is appointed supervising producer. Former producer (to the end of season 8) Leonard Katzman returns as showrunner, but now promoted to executive producer, replacing veteran Philip Capice.  Katzman's son Mitchell Wayne Katzman joins the team as the new story editor. Leah Markus, who wrote for season 4, joins as story consultant.

Writers for the season include Leonard Katzman, David Paulsen, Leah Markus, Mitchell Wayne Katzman, Calvin Clements, Jr., and Louella Lee Caraway. Series star Susan Howard also writes one more episode before leaving the series, both as a writer and as an actress, at the end of the season.

DVD release
Season ten of Dallas was released by Warner Bros. Home Video, on a Region 1 DVD box set of three double-sided DVDs, on January 13, 2009. Unlike the previous Dallas'' DVD box sets (but like the subsequent) it does not include any extras, besides the 29 episodes.

Episodes

References

General references

External links 

1986 American television seasons
1987 American television seasons
Dallas (1978 TV series) seasons